La Piedra Escrita (Spanish for 'the written stone') is a rock art site consisting of a large granite boulder containing pictographs located in the Saliente River in Coabey, Jayuya in central Puerto Rico. The petroglyphs have become popularly associated with the Taino people and have been widely reproduced in popular art, and the site has become a popular tourist attraction. The site was added to the United States National Register of Historic Places in 2003 due to its importance as a prime example of prehistoric rock art in Puerto Rico.

The site located off Highway 144, 3 km, now contains a recreational area that provides access to the petroglyphs and the river, which is popular for swimming.

Gallery

References 

Archaeological sites on the National Register of Historic Places in Puerto Rico
Petroglyphs in Puerto Rico
Pre-Columbian archaeological sites
Tourist attractions in Puerto Rico
Taíno
Jayuya, Puerto Rico